Robert Stene (born 6 January 1983) is a retired Norwegian footballer.

Stene was the top scorer for Ranheim in 2010 and 2012.

Before the 2012 season he signed a contract with Fredrikstad. On 8 December 2014 he returned to his former club Ranheim. On 7 December 2016 he signed a contract for Levanger.

Career statistics

References

1983 births
Living people
Footballers from Trondheim
Norwegian footballers
Byåsen Toppfotball players
Ranheim Fotball players
Hønefoss BK players
Randaberg IL players
Stavanger IF players
Fredrikstad FK players
Norwegian First Division players
Eliteserien players
Association football forwards